Sonya's Story (Russian: История Сони) is an opera by the British composer Neal Thornton to a libretto based on the original Russian text of Anton Chekhov's 1899 play Uncle Vanya. The libretto reproduces passages from Uncle Vanya in English translation with additional spoken text by Neal Thornton. Sonya's Story  premiered on 7 August 2010 at the Riverside Studios in Londonto celebrate Chekhov's 150th anniversary. The production, part of the Tête à Tête festival was directed by Sally Burgess and designed by Charles Phu.

Set in late 19th century Russia, Sonya’s Story is a musical psycho-drama portraying Sonya's responses to her life crises and the limitations presented by her social and personal circumstances. It is the first opera adapted from Uncle Vanya.

Roles

References

External links
Official website of Sonya's Story
Burgess, Sally (30 July 2010). "Sally's story: from singing actress to Chekhovian opera director". The Independent

Operas
2010 operas
Operas based on plays
Operas set in Russia
Operas based on works by Anton Chekhov